Sympistis khem is a moth of the family Noctuidae first described by James T. Troubridge in 2008. It is found in the US state of Utah.

The wingspan is about 33 mm.

References

khem
Moths described in 2008